Helike , also known as , is a moon of Jupiter. It was discovered by a team of astronomers from the University of Hawaii led by Scott S. Sheppard in 2003, and given the temporary designation .

Helike is about 4 kilometres in diameter, and orbits Jupiter at an average distance of 20.54 million kilometres in 601.402 days, at an inclination of 155° to the ecliptic (156° to Jupiter's equator), in a retrograde direction and with an eccentricity of 0.1375. Its average orbital speed is 2.48 km/s.

It was named in March 2005 after Helike, one of the nymphs that nurtured Zeus (Jupiter) in his infancy on Crete.

Helike belongs to the Ananke group.

References

Ananke group
Moons of Jupiter
Irregular satellites
Discoveries by Scott S. Sheppard
Astronomical objects discovered in 2003
Moons with a retrograde orbit